Hiroyuki Abe may refer to:
Hiroyuki Abe (fighter) (born 1970), Japanese mixed martial artist
Hiroyuki Abe (footballer) (born 1989), Japanese football player
Hiroyuki Abe (table tennis), Japanese table tennis international
Hiroyuki Abe, a Japanese politician